Adrianus ("Ad") Theodorus Moolhuijzen (born April 1, 1943, in Arnhem, Gelderland) is a former water polo player from The Netherlands, who finished in seventh position with the Netherlands men's national water polo team at the 1968 Summer Olympics in Mexico City, Mexico.

References
 Dutch Olympic Committee

External links
 

1943 births
Living people
Dutch male water polo players
Olympic water polo players of the Netherlands
Water polo players at the 1968 Summer Olympics
Sportspeople from Arnhem
20th-century Dutch people